Yarden Cohen is an Israeli footballer who plays in the Liga Leumit for Hapoel Afula.

Early life
Cohenwas born in Kfar Vradim, Israel, to a Jewish family.

Career
Cohen is a protege of Hapoel Nazareth Illit youth ranks and in 2010 he became a permanent player in the senior team.

On June 16, 2011, after rejecting a move to Maccabi Haifa he signed a 5-years contract with Maccabi Netanya from the Israeli Premier League. After two years in which he didn't make an impact in Netanya, Cohen returned to play for Nazareth Illit.

On 27 July 2021, Cohen signed for Hapoel Petah Tikva.

References

1991 births
Living people
Israeli Jews
Israeli footballers
Footballers from Northern District (Israel)
Hapoel Nof HaGalil F.C. players
Maccabi Netanya F.C. players
Ironi Tiberias F.C. players
Hapoel Rishon LeZion F.C. players
Hapoel Acre F.C. players
F.C. Kafr Qasim players
Maccabi Ahi Nazareth F.C. players
Hapoel Petah Tikva F.C. players
Hapoel Afula F.C. players
Liga Leumit players
Israeli Premier League players
Association football forwards